Buckhorn is a station in Volksdorf on the Hamburg U-Bahn line U1. It is located on the Ohlstedt branch of the line.

History
The station was built in 1916 under the name "Volksdorf-Nord." The station's architect was Eugen Göbel, who also designed the U-Bahn and S-Bahn stations Barmbek, Hasselbrook, and Ohlsdorf, as well as all underground stations of the Walddörferbahn.

Because of the provisional steam railway operation to Barmbek, initially, no trains stopped at the station. It was only with the beginning of electrical railway operations in 1925 that trains stopped at this station, which now had the name Buckhorn.

Services
Buckhorn is served by Hamburg U-Bahn line U1.

References

Hamburg U-Bahn stations in Hamburg
Buildings and structures in Wandsbek
U1 (Hamburg U-Bahn) stations
Buildings and structures completed in 1916
Railway stations in Germany opened in 1925